Club Deportivo Santa Anita, commonly known as Santa Anita were a Salvadoran professional football club based in Santa Ana.

They competited in the Primera División de Fútbol Profesional between 1949 and 1961. Currently Defunct.

Notable coaches
El Salvador:
Marcelo Estrada

References

Defunct football clubs in El Salvador
Santa Ana, El Salvador